Chintu Ji is a Bollywood film that was released on 4 September 2009. It stars Rishi Kapoor, Priyanshu Chaterjee, Kulraj Randhawa. It was directed by Ranjit Kapoor and written by Shabbir Ahmed. The film was released on Rishi Kapoor's 57th Birthday.

Plot
Rishi (Rishi Kapoor), the son of legendary Raj Kapoor, decides to try his hand at politics, and to garner support, re-locates to his birth village, Hadbahedi. The village is located in an isolated area where most trains do not stop, and electricity is only available for 6 hours a day. He decides to shoot a film 'Khooni Khazana' with Producer/Director, Malkani. Once there, he secretly makes a deal to lend his name to an alcoholic beverage, in exchange for a plot of land in nearby Triphala, and one Crore Rupees, while pledging to the naive villagers that he has no intention to re-locating anywhere. Misled villagers believe Hadbahedi will get popular and modernized, and decide to assist him with all their might. Things escalate into chaos, and anger, when they find out that their valuables are being stolen, and the women being molested, by the film crew, while the police accuse them of harboring a terrorist who was responsible for the 13 December 2001, attack on the Indian Parliament.

Cast

 Rishi Kapoor as Rishi 'Chintuji' Raj Kapoor / Kamlesh Sukheja Ji
 Priyanshu Chatterjee as Arun Bakshi / Mohit Baghel
 Kulraj Randhawa as Devika Malhotra / Mohini Bakshi
 Saurabh Shukla as Malkani
 Grusha Kapoor as Kanta
 Swadesh Badhu as Chaudhryji
Vishal Bahl as Film Unit goon
Gaurav Bhattacharya as Film choreographer
Kanchan Bisht as Friend
 Sophie Choudry as Menka
Sanjiv Chopra as Oberoi
Gilles Chuyen as Jack	
Pankaj Dubey as Arun's Friend - Richshaw
Dheerendra Dwivedi as Manish ad
Satish Fenn as Pilot
Ashish Ghosh as Dr. Ghoshal
Surender Gill as Griver Gopal
Bhupesh Joshi as Bansi
Teekam Joshi as Kutty
Chander Kalra as Zaidi - Post Master
Annu Kapoor as Amar Sanghvi
Kamal Shabnam Kapoor as Shakuntala
Neha Kaul as Ayesha
Ishtiyak Khan as AD
Sergei Khashkouski as Uzbek foreign Secy
Hemant Maahaor	as Gyan - Arun's Friend (as Hemant Mahaur)
Mahendra Mewati as Vidyasagar
Natasha as Russian Interpreter
Padmashree as Nurse Mariama
Govind Pandey as Inspector Chauhan
Harry Parmar as Friend
Manisha Pradhan as Meenu
Shubhdip Raha as Babban
Anil Rastogi as Vashishthji (as Dr. Anil Rastogi)
Kseniya Ryabinkina as Kseniya
Vishal Saini as Hawaldar Joginder
Virender Sharma as Film Action Director
Atamjit Singh as Station Master
Sahib Singh as Lehna
Veer Pratap Singh as Mobile Network Leader
Amitabh Srivastava as Mehta
Pankaj Tripathi as Paplu Yadav
Sanjeev Vatsa as Prakash
P.D. Verma as Writer Amaan
Dinesh Yadav as Dinesh - Servant

References

External links
 

2009 films
2000s Hindi-language films
2009 comedy films
Indian comedy films
Hindi-language comedy films